Edwin Watson (28 May 1914 – 12 June 1944) was a professional footballer, who played for Partick Thistle, Huddersfield Town and Bradford Park Avenue. He was killed in the Second World War. He was born in Pittenweem, Fife, Scotland.

Military service and death
Watson served as a flight sergeant in No. 201 Squadron RAF of the Royal Air Force Volunteer Reserve during the Second World War. He is known to have served on two missions as an air gunner on a Short Sunderland III conducting anti-submarine sweeps from RAF Pembroke Dock over the Bay of Biscay.

Five days later, on 12 June 1944, the Sunderland encountered , and conducted depth charge raids on it. The Sunderland is thought to have been shot down by flak from the submarine's anti-aircraft guns during the attack, killing everybody on board, including Watson. His body was not recovered from the wreckage, and he is remembered on the Runnymede Memorial. In 2021, he was added to the Huddersfield Town 'roll of honour'.

References

1914 births
1944 deaths
Scottish footballers
People from Pittenweem
Footballers from Fife
Association football forwards
English Football League players
Scottish Football League players
Scottish Junior Football Association players
Crossgates Primrose F.C. players
Partick Thistle F.C. players
Huddersfield Town A.F.C. players
Scottish airmen
Bradford (Park Avenue) A.F.C. players
Royal Air Force Volunteer Reserve personnel of World War II
Royal Air Force personnel killed in World War II
Royal Air Force airmen